The Libya national futsal team represents Libya in international futsal competitions and is controlled by the Libyan Football Federation. As of April 2016, Libya is ranked 31st in the Futsal World Rankings.

Awards
 Team of the Year (2005)
 Mover of the Year (2005, 2008)

Tournament records

FIFA Futsal World Cup

Africa Futsal Cup of Nations

Futsal Confederations Cup

Mediterranean Futsal Cup

Arab Futsal Championship

North African Futsal Tournament

Friendly tournaments

Futsal Mundialito
 1994  – 2007 weren't invited
 2008  – 4th Place

Grand Prix de Futsal
 2005  – 2009 weren't invited
 2010  – 10th Place (out of 16)
 2011  – 2015 weren't invited
 2017  – TBD

Sultat Shaab Cup
 2009 –  Champion
 2010 –  Champion

Other tournaments 
 2006 Four Nations Futsal Tournament (Maputo, Mozambique) –  Second Place
 2008 Four Nations Futsal Cup (Loughborough, England) –  Second Place
 2008 El-Fatih International Futsal Championship  –  Champion 
 2010 Omar Almokhtar Futsal International Cup –

Current team 
 As of the 2012 FIFA Futsal World Cup
Coach :  Pablo Prieto Perille

Recent matches 

Here are the upcoming and the last 5 matches. For the complete list click on the above link

See also
 Futsal in Libya
 Libya national football team
 http://roonba.50webs.com/

References

 
Libya
National Team